Toby Litt is an English writer and academic in the Department of English and Humanities at Birkbeck, University of London.

Life
Litt was born in Ampthill in 1968. He was educated at Bedford Modern School, read English at Worcester College, Oxford and studied Creative Writing at the University of East Anglia where he was taught by Malcolm Bradbury.

A short story by Toby Litt was included in the anthology All Hail the New Puritans (2000), edited by Matt Thorne and Nicholas Blincoe, and he has edited The Outcry (2001), Henry James's last completed novel, for Penguin in the UK.  In 2003 he was nominated by Granta magazine as one of the 20 'Best of Young British Novelists', although his work since then has met with mixed reviews, one reviewer in the Guardian writing that his novel I Play the Drums in a Band Called Okay "goes on ... and on, and on. There is plenty of story here, but little plot, and no tension." He edited the 13th edition of New Writing (the British Council's annual anthology of the finest contemporary writing in fiction, non-fiction and poetry) and is known for naming his books in alphabetical order.

Litt wrote an interactive short story, using LiveJournal and Twitter, as part of the Penguin We Tell Stories project. He is currently a lecturer in Creative Writing at Birkbeck, University of London and led the campaign to get Arvind Mehrotra elected to the Oxford Professor of Poetry following Ruth Padel's resignation. In 2011, he took part in the Bush Theatre's Sixty-Six Books project where he wrote a piece based upon a book of the King James Bible.

Bibliography

Fiction
 Adventures in Capitalism (collection of short stories, 1996)
 Beatniks (1997)
 Corpsing (2000)
 deadkidsongs (2001)
 Exhibitionism (collection of short stories, 2002)
 Finding Myself (2003)
 Ghost Story (2004)
 Hospital, (2007)
 I Play the Drums in a Band Called Okay (2008)
 Journey into Space (2009)
 King Death (2010)
 Lilian's Spell Book (2013)
 Life-Like (2014)
 Monster (in The Book of Other People, ed. Zadie Smith, 2007)
 Notes For A Young Gentleman (2018)
 O (short stories - exists)
 Patience (2019)

Comic books
 Dead Boy Detectives (2014)

Non-fiction
Wrestliana (2018)

References

External links
 
 MySpace: Toby Litt
 Interview
 
 Birkbeck, School of English & Humanities Department of English, Theatre and Creative Writing — Birkbeck, University of London

1968 births
Living people
People educated at Bedford Modern School
Alumni of Worcester College, Oxford
Alumni of the University of East Anglia
Academics of Birkbeck, University of London
21st-century English novelists
English short story writers
People from Bedford
People from Ampthill
English male short story writers
English male novelists
21st-century British short story writers
21st-century English male writers